LaVerne Lester "Little Moose" Meyer (June 17, 1917 – July 1, 1962) was an American professional basketball player. He played for the Kankakee Gallagher Trojans in the National Basketball League for three games during the 1938–39 season and averaged 2.3 points per game.

He is not related to teammate Big Moose Meyer, who happened to play alongside him with the Trojans. A heart attack killed Meyer at age 45.

References

1917 births
1962 deaths
American men's basketball players
Basketball players from Illinois
Guards (basketball)
Kankakee Gallagher Trojans players
People from Will County, Illinois